Day Kimball Hospital is an acute care teaching hospital located in the West End of Putnam, Connecticut. Day Kimball Hospital was established in 1894.  The hospital campus is located on Pomfret St in Putnam, and is directly adjacent to the main office of the Day Kimball Healthcare building.

Background 
The hospital opened in 1894 after Mrs. M. Day Kimball donated $5,000 for the construction of the infirmary building in memory of her recently deceased son, Day Kimball, with the condition that the hospital be named after him. Other family members made donations which came to a total of $9,000.

The hospital is now a 104-bed acute care community hospital that specializes in hip and knee replacement, specialty care maternity, and primary stroke. They have been awarded  4 stars for their standards of care on medicare.gov.

Helicopter ambulance 
Hartford Hospital operates an air ambulance service, LIFE STAR, which began operation in 1985 and operates one American Eurocopter BK-117 helicopter and one American Eurocopter EC-145.  One helicopter is based at MidState Medical Center in Meriden, CT. and another is based at affiliated Backus Hospital in Norwich, Connecticut. LIFE STAR provides patient care and inter-facility transport between hospitals in New England and New York, and advanced life support scene response and transport for the most critically injured and medically unstable patients in Connecticut, who are taken to Level I or Level II trauma centers across the state according to state regulations.  The program averages 1,400 patient transports per year and plays a vital role in providing speedy access to trauma care for patients in outlying, rural areas.

See also 

 List of hospitals in Connecticut

References

External links 
 Official Website
 Connecticut History

Hospital buildings completed in 1894
Putnam, Connecticut
Teaching hospitals in Connecticut
1894 establishments in Connecticut